Anders Gunnar Svensson (born 17 July 1976) is a Swedish former professional footballer. He was a central midfielder, known for his passing, free kicks, and set piece-taking abilities, who usually operated in a playmaking role. He was capped 148 times for the Swedish national football team, many times as a captain, before he retired from international football in 2013. He is the most capped male player for Sweden, beating Thomas Ravelli's previous record of 143 caps.

As well as being named captain of Sweden on several occasions, Svensson also captained Southampton and Elfsborg. He played important roles in the 2002 and 2006 World Cups, in which he proved his leadership skills, resulting in him being named captain of that Sweden national team in 2009.

He is the eighth-most capped European player in history, after Lothar Matthäus, Martin Reim, Cristiano Ronaldo, Iker Casillas, Vitālijs Astafjevs, Sergio Ramos, and Gianluigi Buffon. Svensson also represented the Swedish national football team at three consecutive European Championships, in 2004, 2008, and 2012.

Early years
Svensson was born on 17 July 1976 in Gothenburg to parents Bertil and Gun Svensson. Svensson has three brothers, the oldest one, Thomas, Kristoffer, and the youngest one, Marcus. His father Bertil was his coach at Guldhedens IK. He grew up watching English football on television, and when he finally played the game, he was compared with one of the best talents of English football David Beckham. In 1980, Svensson played for Guldhedens IK, where he played for ten years.

Club career

IF Elfsborg
Svensson played at Guldhedens IK for ten years, until he moved to Borås, where he began to play for IF Elfsborg.

As his role on the pitch was that of an offensive midfielder, although at Southampton he also played on the left side of midfield. He made his breakthrough while playing for IF Elfsborg in the late 1990s before moving to English side Southampton in 2001.

Southampton
Svensson moved to Southampton on 14 June 2001 for a £750,000 transfer fee. In his first season in the Premier League, Svensson scored four goals in 35 appearances for the Saints, and the club finished in 11th place, missing the UEFA Cup participation by just one point. He was a key player for Southampton; although near the end of his time with the club, he was rarely selected for Gordon Strachan's starting 11.

He played an important role for Southampton in their success in the 2002–03 FA Cup. Their opening match was a 4–0 win against fellow Premier League club Tottenham Hotspur. Svensson scored a goal along with other goal scorers Michael Svensson, Jo Tessem, and James Beattie, taking the club to a second consecutive victory against Tottenham, having beaten them on New Year's Day in the league. He played for Southampton in the 2003 FA Cup Final against Arsenal, which Southampton lost 1–0.
Svensson also played in the 2003–04 UEFA Cup for the Saints, but the club was knocked out of the tournament in the first round.

During his time with Southampton, Svensson made 140 appearances. Despite chairman Rupert Lowe allegedly offering him a new contract, Svensson turned down the offer in order to return to his former club IF Elfsborg.

Return to IF Elfsborg

He rejoined Elfsborg in 2005 and was the captain of the team until 2014, when he gave up the title to Johan Larsson. He helped the team win the 2006 and 2012 Allsvenskan titles. After another 10 years at IF Elfsborg Svensson decided to announce his retirement from professional football in 2015.

International career
In 1996, he debuted in the Swedish under-21 team. In 1998, he played in the U-21 championships along with Jörgen Pettersson, Yksel Osmanovski, Daniel Andersson, and Freddie Ljungberg.

He debuted for the Swedish national side against South Africa in 1999.

He was known for being a good free kick taker, which he showed in the 2002 World Cup in South Korea/Japan, where he scored a free kick goal against Argentina, which effectively eliminated the opponent in the group stages. He set up the opening goal for Henrik Larsson against Senegal through an in-swinging corner. He nearly scored a golden goal in extra time, but his shot from inside the box was denied by the post. He played for Sweden in the Euro 2004, as well as the 2006 World Cup.

However, he found form for the national team during the Euro 2008 qualifying stage. He played 11 games with 2 goals and 1 assist which led Sweden to the Euro 2008. Svensson played every minute of every game during Euro 2008, but did not find form. His frustration showed, conceding a few free kicks during their last game in the tournament. After Henrik Larsson retired, and Zlatan Ibrahimović declared that he was unsure about his future in the national team, Svensson was the team captain for Sweden in a friendly against Italy (0–1). After Ibrahimović returned to the national team in the summer of 2010, Svensson was named co-captain, although Ibrahimović remained official captain on the pitch.

On 6 September 2013, Svensson became the joint most capped male player in Swedish football history, equalling Thomas Ravelli's record with his 143rd cap; he would later claim the record for himself. It was to be a memorable night for Svensson, as he scored the winner as Sweden came from behind to beat Ireland 2–1. In November 2013, the Swedish Football Association (SvFF) sparked a sexism scandal at its annual awards Gala when it presented Svensson with a Volvo car for winning 146 caps. The governing body was widely criticised for failing to honour Therese Sjögran, who had 187 caps. After Sweden failed to win against Portugal in the play-offs for the World Cup 2014 in November 2013, Svensson decided to retire from international duty.

Post-playing career
In 2014, Svensson, still actively playing at that time, started to work as a football commentator for Kanal 5.

Personal life
Svensson was in a two-year relationship with fashion designer Anine Bing while playing for Southampton. The pair met in London where she was modeling at the time. Svensson married Emma Johansson in July 2007 at Thorsborg's castle.

Career statistics

International 

Scores and results list Sweden's goal tally first, score column indicates score after each Svensson goal.

Honours
IF Elfsborg
 Allsvenskan: 2006, 2012
 Svenska Cupen: 2000–01, 2013–14
 Svenska Supercupen: 2007
 Atlantic Cup: 2011

Southampton
 FA Cup runner-up: 2002–03

See also
 List of men's footballers with 100 or more international caps

References

External links

 
 
 

1976 births
Living people
Footballers from Gothenburg
Swedish footballers
Association football midfielders
Sweden international footballers
Sweden under-21 international footballers
2002 FIFA World Cup players
2006 FIFA World Cup players
UEFA Euro 2004 players
UEFA Euro 2008 players
UEFA Euro 2012 players
FIFA Century Club
FA Cup Final players
Allsvenskan players
Superettan players
IF Elfsborg players
Premier League players
Southampton F.C. players
Swedish expatriate footballers
Swedish expatriate sportspeople in England
Expatriate footballers in England
Swedish association football commentators